Nacimiento may refer to:

Settlements
Nacimiento, Chile, a municipality in the province of Bío Bío, region of Bío Bío, Chile
Nacimiento, Spain, a municipality in the province of Almería, Andalusia, Spain
Nacimiento, California, United States
Lake Nacimiento, California, United States
, in the Mexican state of Coahuila, a Kickapoo settlement

Other geographic features
Nacimiento Mountains, a mountain range in the northwestern part of the US state of New Mexico
Cerro del Nacimiento, a mountain peak in the Andes in Argentina
Nacimiento Formation, a Paleocene-age rock unit in the San Juan Basin of New Mexico
Nacimiento River, in California
Lake Nacimiento, in California

Other uses
Nacimiento 28 diciembre, a traditional nativity scene in many Spanish-speaking countries